The Tabenbulakian age  is a period of geologic time (28.4–23.03 Ma) within the Oligocene Epoch of the late Paleogene Period and Miocene Epoch of the early Neogene Period, used more specifically with Asian Land Mammal Ages.

It follows the Hsandagolian age.

The Tabenbulakian's lower boundary is the approximate base of the Chattian age and upper boundary is the approximate base of the Aquitanian age.

See also

References

Oligocene geochronology
Oligocene Asia
Miocene Asia
Chattian
.
.
Oligocene life
Miocene life